Monoctenia is a genus of moths in the family Geometridae erected by Achille Guenée in 1857. All species are found in Australia.

Species

Monoctenia smerintharia R. Felder & Rogenhofer, 1875
Monoctenia falernaria Guenée, 1857

References

Oenochrominae